Roger Gould, M.D. is an American writer, psychiatrist and leading authority on adult psychological development.

In his book Transformations, Gould presents his view that adult psychological development consists of the "dismantling of the illusions of safety developed in childhood". Gould’s theory suggests that these illusions are confronted in a time-sensitive sequence as one progresses through the life-cycle. His research was used extensively in Passages, by Gail Sheehy.

Gould has pioneered the use of computer-assisted and web-based therapy. He was honored by The Smithsonian Institution as a pioneer in the field of computer-assisted therapy. In 2001, Gould’s method of computer-assisted therapy was found to be about as effective as traditional therapy.

Gould is also the founder of Shrink Yourself, an online, weight-loss program that uses his web-based therapy techniques to eliminate emotional eating, binge eating, overeating and other forms of excessive, compulsive or uncontrolled eating. In 2007, he published a second book, Shrink Yourself: Break Free from Emotional Eating Forever, based on the Shrink Yourself online program. In both the book and online program, Gould suggests that the powerlessness people feel over their cravings to eat when they are emotionally upset is a cover-up for a deeper sense of powerlessness in areas, or "layers", of their lives not directly connected to eating. By examining one’s sense of powerlessness in the areas identified, Gould claims one can end emotional eating and other form of uncontrolled eating.

References 

Living people
1935 births
American psychiatrists